André Bloch (14 January 1873, in Wissembourg – 7 August 1960, in Paris) was a French composer and music educator.

Biography
Bloch studied with André Gedalge, Ernest Guiraud, and Jules Massenet at the Conservatoire de Paris. In 1893 he won the Prix de Rome for his cantata Antigone which used a text by Ferdinand Beissier. The prize enabled him to pursue further studies at the French Academy in Rome. In 1898 he joined the faculty of the Conservatoire de Paris as a professor of harmony. One of his notable pupils at that school was Jehan Alain. He later taught at American Conservatory in Fontainebleau. His private students included the composer Fernand Oubradous.

Bloch was known primarily as an opera composer. His first opera, Maïda, premiered in 1909, and his last opera, Guignol, was created in 1939 and premiered in 1949 at the Opéra-Comique in Paris. He also composed symphonic works, ballets, chamber music, piano works and chansons.

References

External links
Jewish Encyclopedia: "Bloch, André" by Isidore Singer and Amélie André Gedalge (1906).

1873 births
1960 deaths
People from Wissembourg
Academic staff of the Conservatoire de Paris
Conservatoire de Paris alumni
French male classical composers
French music educators
French opera composers
Male opera composers
Prix de Rome for composition
French classical composers